|purpose = Promotion of the study and scientific research of social sciences and human behavior
}}
The Association of Psychological and Social Studies is a learned society, which was founded 9 January 1998 by a group of researchers, teachers, and professionals related to the social sciences, psychology, pedagogy, medicine, and law. The association has its head office in Zaragoza (Spain). The president is Javier Garcés Prieto (2023).

Aims 
The main objectives of the association are:
 Promoting the study and scientific research of social sciences and human behavior
 Carrying out projects to improve the individual quality of life and social development
 Stimulate research and projects related to health, understood as physical, mental, and social welfare
 Organizing educational and informative programs, nationally and internationally, to make advances in psychology, sociology, health, and legal science available to the society at large
 Collaborating with other public and private institutions in favor of individual welfare improvement, social progress, and social integration of neglected collectives

Activities 
Some of the most important activities of the society are or have been the following:
 Studies of psychological and social problems of modern society, carried out by association researchers on consumerism, shopping addiction, and the excessive or inappropriate use of new technology.
 Consumer behavior and new models of development to make economic progress compatible with ethical and sustainable consuming.
 Promoting active and critical consumer's movement as well as adult and young citizens education as responsible consumers.
 Studying and spreading the scientific psychology aspects useful to the daily life of citizens. The more relevant projects in these fields have been those related to non-pharmacological alternatives to stress and anxiety problems, psychological welfare, mental health, and rational use of psychoactive medicines.
 Psychology of sport and physical activity, with the starting-up, in 2008, of a group of professionals and researchers in this field.
In the last years, the Association has carried out several works of research and publications related to sustainable mobility and climate change. Since 2021 it has participated in the organisation and development of the Climate Change Communication Conference. The most relevant publications and research that the Association has performed in these matters are referred o emotional impact of climate change, ecoanxiety and the relationship among environmental problems, consumerism and mental health.

Organization 
The association is organized in six sections: psychology, sociology, education, consuming, health, and citizen participation.

An independent study concluded that the association is among the more outstanding Spanish entities as well as one of the most efficiently run.

References

External links 
 

Psychological societies
Sociological organizations
Scientific societies based in Spain
Scientific organizations established in 1998
1998 establishments in Spain